Équateur (French for "Equator") was a province in the northwest of the Belgian Congo and the successor Republic of the Congo, now known as Democratic Republic of the Congo.
It had its origins in the Équateur District of the Congo Free State, the private property of King Leopold II of Belgium. 
It was upgraded to the status of a province in 1917. Between 1933 and 1947 it was named Coquilhatville.
In 1962 it was divided into three smaller provinces, but there were recombined in 1966.
Équateur was one of the eleven provinces of the Democratic Republic of the Congo until 2015, when it was split into the new, smaller Équateur province, as well as the Tshuapa, Mongala, Nord-Ubangi and Sud-Ubangi provinces.

Located in the north of the country, the province bordered the Republic of the Congo to the west, the Central African Republic to the north, to the east the Orientale province, and to the south the Kasai-Oriental, Kasai-Occidental, and Bandundu provinces.

History

The District of Équateur was created by decree of Leopold II on 1 August 1888, which defined the limits of the Congo Free State and the eleven districts, including Équateur. 
The first district commissioners were named on 27 October 1888.
At first there was no commissioner for Equateur, but on 25 June 1889 the governor general placed Van Kerchhoven, successor to Camille Coquilhat, in command of the District of Ubangi and Uele based at Nouvelle-Anvers (formerly Bangala Station).
The first true head of Équateur was Charles-François-Alexandre Lemaire (1863-1925), appointed in December 1890.
He moved the district capital to the newly named Coquilhatville.

In 1908 the state of Belgium annexed the Congo Free State as the Belgian Congo.
In 1917 Équateur District became Équateur Province under Georges Moulaert (1875-1958), who became deputy governor general of the province on 20 August 1917.
In 1933 the province was renamed Coquihatville Province, under a provincial commissioner. 
The first commissioner was J. Jorrissen.
On 27 May 1947 the province regained the name of Équateur/Evenaar. It became an autonomous province of the Congo republic on 30 June 1960.
On 14 August 1962 Équateur was split into the provinces of Cuvette Centrale, Ubangi, and a centrally administered portion that became Moyen-Congo on 5 February 1963.

On 25 April 1966 Cuvette Centrale, Moyen-Congo and Ubangi were reunited as Équateur province.
In 2015 when it was again split under the terms of the 2006 Constitution, it formed five new provinces:
Nord-Ubangi, consisting of 56.644 km², with its capital at the city of Gbadolite 
Mongala, consisting of 58.141 km², with its capital at the city of Lisala
Sud-Ubangi, consisting of 51.648 km², with its capital at the city of Gemena
Équateur, consisting of 103.902 km², with its capital at the city of Mbandaka
Tshuapa, consisting of 132.957 km², with its capital at the city of Boende

Divisions

Under the Democratic Republic of the Congo, the province was divided into the cities of Mbandaka, Gbadolite and Zongo and the districts of Équateur, Nord-Ubangi, Sud-Ubangi, Mongala and Tshuapa.

Education
 University of Mbandaka

See also

List of governors of Équateur (former province)

References

Sources

Bibliography

Konda ku Mbuta, A. et al. (2012); Plantes medicinales de traditions - Province de l'Equateur, R.D. Congo; I.R.S.S. Kinshasa; ; 419 pp.

Équateur (former province)
Former provinces of the Democratic Republic of the Congo (1966–2015)